The Khâm định Việt sử Thông giám cương mục (lit. "The Imperially Ordered Annotated Text Completely Reflecting the History of Viet") was a history of Vietnam commissioned by the emperor Tự Đức of the Nguyễn dynasty. It was written in Văn ngôn (which is a form of Classical Chinese used in Vietnam).

Emperor Tự Đức's interest in history led him to order the creation of this book in 1856. He appointed Phan Thanh Giản the chief editor. It was finished in 1859 and additionally annotated by the emperor himself. After several modifications in 1871, 1872, 1876, and 1878, the book was finally published in 1884.

Khâm định Việt sử Thông giám cương mục was translated into the Vietnamese alphabet in 1960. It can now be found online in the National Library of Vietnam.

Contents
Khâm định Việt sử Thông giám cương mục contains 53 volumes.

References

External links 

digitized version.

Vietnamese books
Nguyen dynasty texts
History books about Vietnam
19th-century history books